Sabaw is a Kachin family name. This family name belongs to the Kachin that live in Kachin State in Burma. They are originally from Sabaw Ga called Sabaw Land (Northern Burma). The name originates from a certain group of people living in that land who were notably prosperous and rich with livestock. From the name Sut baw (rich or prosperous) comes Sabaw. They belong to the Hka Hku [one of the tribes from Kachin (Kachin State)] and a few others living in the surrounding area today. Sabaw is Family Name and Amyu [the clan relationship name] is Udi Chyang Maja, Hkashu Hkasha.

Sabaw, in other words Sah-Bao, is a mythical creature found in the Northern Philippines. Sabaw like to prey on street cats and alley dogs. There are no records of Sabaws attacking real live humans.

Sabaw is also the Filipino word for soup and/or the liquid component of any dish, particularly stews.

Sabaw is also Filipino slang used for a person whose brain is not functioning properly anymore. For instance, when a person has just woken up or when a person has stayed up late and is suffering from sleep deprivation. For example, "Steven is so sabaw. He can't even spell Athena's name correctly."

Surnames
Burmese culture